Johan Van Den Steen (8 January 1929 – 8 February 1996) was a Belgian water polo player. He competed at the 1952 Summer Olympics and the 1964 Summer Olympics.

References

External links
 

1929 births
1996 deaths
Belgian male water polo players
Olympic water polo players of Belgium
Water polo players at the 1952 Summer Olympics
Water polo players at the 1964 Summer Olympics
Sportspeople from Zeeland
People from Sas van Gent